Košarkaški klub Radnički 1950, commonly referred to as KK Radnički 1950, is a men's professional basketball club based in Kragujevac, Serbia. The club was founded in Smederevska Palanka in 2007 as KK Mladost Palanka, and was relocated to Kragujevac in 2014. The club currently plays in the Second Basketball League of Serbia.

History

Radnički 1950 
The club has changed its name on 6 October 2014, following the disestablishment of Radnički Kragujevac in summer 2014.

In its second season in the First Regional League, West Division Radnički 1950 won the League and got promoted to the Second League of Serbia for the 2016–17 season.

In August 2018, Zoran Stevanović became the club's president.

Following departure from Partizan, Nikola Lončar joined the club's staff.

Players

 Luka Igrutinović

Coaches 

  Igor Todorović (2014–2018)
  Ivica Vukotić (2018–2020)
  Zoran Cvetanović (2020–2021)
  Igor Todorović (2021–2022)
  Nenad Nikolić (2022–present)

Season by season

Source: SrbijaSport

Trophies and awards

Trophies
 First Regional League, West Division (3rd-tier)
 Winners (2): 2015–16, 2021–22

References

External links
Official website 
Profile at eurobasket.com

 
Basketball teams established in 2007
Sport in Kragujevac
Basketball teams in Serbia
2007 establishments in Serbia